The Faxon House is a historic house at 310 Adams Street in Quincy, Massachusetts.  The oldest portion of this house was built in 1880 by Job Faxon, a Boston-based flour merchant.  His son Henry retained the Boston firm of Shepard and Stearns, and expanded and redesigned the house in Colonial Revival style in 1931, a time when larger estates on Adams Street were being subdivided for development.  The house is one of the most elaborate and well-preserved examples of the style in Quincy.

The house was listed on the National Register of Historic Places in 1989.

See also
National Register of Historic Places listings in Quincy, Massachusetts

References

Colonial Revival architecture in Massachusetts
Houses completed in 1880
Houses in Quincy, Massachusetts
National Register of Historic Places in Quincy, Massachusetts
Houses on the National Register of Historic Places in Norfolk County, Massachusetts